"Down in Mississippi (Up to No Good)" is a song written and recorded by American country music group Sugarland.  It was released in March 2006 as the fourth and final single from the album Twice the Speed of Life, Sugarland's only album as a trio.  Starting with the next single, "Want To," Sugarland has comprised Kristian Bush and Jennifer Nettles, with Kristen Hall departing.

Critical reception

Dave Tianen of the Milwaukee Journal-Sentinel wrote that the song "has obviously connected as a girls' night out anthem."

Performances
Sugarland performed the song at the 2006 CMT Music Awards and Academy of Country Music awards.

Chart performance
"Down in Mississippi" debuted on the Hot Country Songs charts dated for the week ending March 25, 2006. It spent 20 weeks on the chart and peaked at number 17. The song also peaked at number 1 on Bubbling Under Hot 100.

References

2006 singles
Music videos directed by Shaun Silva
Sugarland songs
Songs written by Kristian Bush
Songs written by Jennifer Nettles
Songs written by Kristen Hall
Song recordings produced by Garth Fundis
Mercury Nashville singles
2004 songs
Songs about Mississippi